The Music Bank Chart is a record chart established in 1998 on the South Korean KBS television music program Music Bank. Every week during its live broadcast, the show gives an award for the best-performing single on the South Korean chart. The chart includes digital performances on domestic online music services (65%), album sales (5%), number of times the single was broadcast on KBS TV (20%), and viewers' choice  from online surveys (10%), a methodology that has been used since November 2020. On February 25, KBS changed the methodology to include social media score (5%), calculated using YouTube and TikTok data gathered from the Gaon charts. They also reduced the percentage from domestic online music services to 60%. The score for domestic online music services is calculated using data from Melon, Bugs, Genie Music, Naver Vibe and Flo. 

In 2022, 41 singles achieved number one on the chart, and 31 acts were awarded first-place trophies. "Hot" by Seventeen had the highest score of the year, with 13,816 points on the June 3 broadcast. Ive's "After Like" won four trophies, making it the most-awarded song of the year. Ive had three number one singles on the chart in 2022 achieved with "Eleven", "Love Dive" and "After Like". The three songs spent a total of nine weeks atop the chart, making Ive the act with the most wins of the year.

Chart history

Notes

References 

2022 in South Korean music
2022 record charts
Lists of number-one songs in South Korea